Thomas Warren Kopp (September 18, 1938 – November 10, 2007) was a minor league baseball player and collegiate American football coach. He served as the head football coach at Colby College from 1979 to 1982. Kopp had previously served as an assistant football coach at Dartmouth College from 1971 to 1978.

References

External links

1938 births
2007 deaths
Baseball catchers
Baseball outfielders
Colby Mules football coaches
Dartmouth Big Green football coaches
Fort Walton Beach Jets players
UConn Huskies baseball players
UConn Huskies football coaches
Wytheville Twins players
High school football coaches in Connecticut
Sportspeople from Waterbury, Connecticut
Players of American football from Connecticut
Baseball players from Connecticut